Jimitota Onoyume is a prominent Nigerian journalist who is currently the Vanguard newspaper correspondent in Rivers State. A resident of Port Harcourt, Onoyume's reports are mostly major news and exclusive storylines.

Personal life

Family abduction
On 12 November 2012, Marian, the teacher wife of Onoyume and her two children were kidnapped by gunmen in Ethiope-East. A sum of N10 million was demanded, although Onoyume managed to negotiate down the amount. On 15 November, Marian and her two young daughters were reportedly released unharmed following a ransom payment made by her husband.

See also
List of people from Port Harcourt

References

Living people
Journalists from Rivers State
People from Port Harcourt
Nigerian newspaper reporters and correspondents
Year of birth missing (living people)